Joseph-Achille Mbembe, known as Achille Mbembe (born 1957), is a Cameroonian historian, political theorist, and public intellectual who is a research professor in history and politics at the Wits Institute for Social and Economy Research at the University of the Witwatersrand. He is well known for his writings on colonialism and its consequences and is a leading figure in new wave French critical theory.

Biography
Mbembe was born near Otélé in Cameroon in 1957. He obtained his Ph.D. in history at the University of Sorbonne in Paris, France, in 1989. He subsequently obtained a D.E.A. in political science at the Instituts d'études politiques in the same city. He has held appointments at Columbia University in New York, Brookings Institution in Washington, D.C., University of Pennsylvania, University of California, Berkeley, Yale University, Duke University and Council for the Development of Social Science Research in Africa (CODESRIA) in Dakar, Senegal.

Mbembe was assistant professor of history at Columbia University, New York, from 1988 to 1991, a senior research fellow at the Brookings Institution in Washington, D.C., from 1991 to 1992, associate professor of history at the University of Pennsylvania from 1992 to 1996, executive director of the Council for the Development of Social Science Research in Africa (Codesria) in Dakar, Senegal, from 1996 to 2000. Achille was also a visiting professor at the University of California, Berkeley, in 2001, and a visiting professor at Yale University in 2003. He was a research professor in history and politics at Harvard University's W. E. B. Du Bois Research Institute. In 2020 Mbembe delivered the presidential lecture in the Humanities at Stanford University.

Mbembe has written extensively on African history and politics, including La naissance du maquis dans le Sud-Cameroun (Paris: Karthala, 1996).  On the Postcolony was published in Paris in 2000 in French and the English translation was published by the University of California Press, Berkeley, in 2001. In 2015, Wits University Press published a new, African edition.  He has an A1 rating from the National Research Foundation.

Current appointments

Mbembe is currently a member of the staff at the Wits Institute for Social and Economic Research (WISER) at the University of the Witwatersrand in Johannesburg, South Africa, and has an annual visiting appointment at the Franklin Humanities Institute at Duke University.

He is a contributing editor to the scholarly journal Public Culture.

Work
Mbembe's main research topics are African history, postcolonial studies and politics and social science. Although he is called a postcolonial theorist, namely due to the title of his first English book, he has thoroughly rejected this label more recently, because he sees his project as one of both acceptance and transcendence of difference, rather than of return to an original, marginal, non-metropolitan homeland.

Mbembe's most important works are: Les jeunes et l'ordre politique en Afrique noire (1985); La naissance du maquis dans le Sud-Cameroun (1920–1960); Histoire des usages de la raison en colonie (1996); De la postcolonie. Essai sur l'imagination politique dans l'Afrique contemporaine (On the Postcolony) (2000); Sortir de la grande nuit: Essai sur l'Afrique décolonisée (2003); Critique de la raison nègre (2013).

His central work On the Postcolony was translated into English and released by University of California Press in 2001. This influential work has also been republished in an African edition by Wits University Press and contains a new preface by Achille Mbembe. In this text, Mbembe argues that academic and popular discourse on Africa gets caught within various cliches tied to Western fantasies and fears.  Following Frantz Fanon and Sigmund Freud, Mbembe holds that this depiction is not a reflection of an authentic Africa but an unconscious projection tied to guilt, disavowal, and the compulsion to repeat. Like James Ferguson, V.Y. Mudimbe, and others, Mbembe interprets Africa not as a defined, isolated place but as a fraught relationship between itself and the rest of the world which plays out simultaneously on political, psychic, semiotic, and sexual levels.

Mbembe claims that Michel Foucault's concept of biopower – as an assemblage of disciplinary power and biopolitics – is no longer sufficient to explain these contemporary forms of subjugation. To the insights of Foucault regarding the notions of sovereign power and biopower, Mbembe adds the concept of necropolitics, which goes beyond merely "inscribing bodies within disciplinary apparatuses". Discussing the examples of Palestine, Africa, and Kosovo, Mbembe shows how the power of sovereignty now becomes enacted through the creation of zones of death where death becomes the ultimate exercise of domination and the primary form of resistance.

He has also examined Johannesburg as a metropolitan city and the work of Frantz Fanon.

Cancellation of Ruhrtriennale address
In May 2019 the German Parliament passed a resolution branding the  BDS movement antisemitic. In addition all German states were advised to deny public funding for events or people supportive of that movement. In early 2020, the Federal Commissioner for Jewish Life and the fight against antisemitism, Felix Klein, called for the cancellation of a keynote address by Mbembe scheduled to be delivered on 14 August that summer at the Ruhrtriennale. He claimed Mbembe had "relativised the Holocaust and denied Israel's right to exist". The invitation was withdrawn, and the festival itself was cancelled due to the COVID-19 pandemic.

The evidence for this charge was based on comments Mbembe made in two books where he drew parallels between the separatist policies deployed in the Israeli occupation of the Palestinian territories and South Africa under Apartheid. Mbembe was supported by groups of Israeli and Jewish academics, including some prominent German Holocaust scholars. Concerns were raised over what some argued was a "weaponization of antisemitism", and, later that year, in December, representatives of 32 prominent cultural institutions issued a declaration both rejecting the BDS movement and, at the same time, warning that, rather than reining in antisemitism, the resolution posed dangers to freedom of speech. In response, Monika Grütters, Germany's minister for culture, stated that cultural institutions walk a tightrope between artistic freedoms and socially acceptable ideas, and that anti-Semitism was a redline issue.

Awards
 2015 Geschwister-Scholl-Preis for his work Critique de la raison nègre
 2018 Gerda Henkel Prize

Private life 
Mbembe is married to Sarah Nuttall, who is Professor of Literary and Cultural Studies and Director of the Wits Institute for Social and Economic Research at the University of the Witwatersrand, Johannesburg. They have written several texts together and have two children.

Bibliography

Books (English) 

 On the Postcolony, University of California Press, 2001. 
 Critique of Black Reason, Translated by Laurent Dubois, Duke University Press, 2017. 
 Necropolitics, Duke University Press, 2019. , 
 Out of the Dark Night: Essays on Decolonization, Columbia University Press, 2021. 
 The Earthly Community: Reflections on the Last Utopia, V2_Publishing, Rotterdam, 2022.

Books (French) 
1985 Les Jeunes et l'ordre politique en Afrique noire, Éditions L'Harmattan, Paris 1985 
 1996 La naissance du maquis dans le Sud-Cameroun, 1920–1960: histoire des usages de la raison en colonie.
 2000 De La Postcolonie, essai sur l'imagination politique dans l'Afrique contemporaine. (English edition On the Postcolony, 2001. Second revised French edition, 2005.)
 2000 Du Gouvernement prive indirect. (English edition On Private Indirect Government (State of the Literature), 2002.)
 2010 Sortir de la grande nuit – Essai sur l'Afrique décolonisée
 2013 Critique de la raison nègre. 
 2016 Politiques de l'inimitié
 2020 Brutalisme Editions de la Découverte.

Articles 
The Society of Enmity, Radical Philosophy, RP 200 (Nov/Dec 2016).
Provisional Notes on the Postcolony, Africa: Journal of the International African Institute Vol. 62, No. 1 (1992).
Le droit universel à larespiration, Analyse Opinion Critique, Yale University.
La démondialisation, Esprit, 2018/12 (December)
Necropolitics, Public Culture, Volume 15, Number 1, Winter 2003, pp. 11–40, Duke University Press.

Secondary literature

Books 
Matthias Böckmann, Matthias Gockel, Reinhart Kößler, Henning Melber: Jenseits von Mbembe – Geschichte, Erinnerung, Solidarität. Metropol Verlag, Berlin 2022, ISBN 3-86331-677-0

Articles 
‘Genealogical Misfortunes’: Achille Mbembe’s (Re-)Writing of Postcolonial Africa', Michael Syrotinski, Paragraph, 35 (3). pp. 407-420. ISSN 0264-8334.

Notes

Citations

Sources

Further reading 
 "Future Knowledges and the Dilemmas of Decolonization", Lecture by Mbembe at Duke University.
"Transcript: In conversation with Achille Mbembe", UCL
Select pages of Necropolitics hosted by Duke University Press.

External links

Staff Profile at WISER, WITS University
Mbembe's profile at The European Graduate School / EGS.

1957 births
21st-century philosophers
French philosophers
University of Paris alumni
Philosophers
Duke University faculty
Academic staff of the University of the Witwatersrand
Cameroonian philosophers
Cameroonian political scientists
Postcolonial theorists
Sciences Po alumni
Living people
Fanon scholars
Foucault scholars
Bassa people (Cameroon)